Jérémy Pinvidic (born March 6, 1987 in Brest) is a French professional football player. Currently, he plays in the Championnat National for Stade Plabennécois.

He played on the professional level in Ligue 2 for Stade Brestois 29.

External links
 Career summary by foot-national.com

1987 births
Living people
French footballers
Ligue 2 players
Stade Brestois 29 players
Stade Plabennécois players
Association football midfielders
Sportspeople from Brest, France
Footballers from Brittany